Libkov is name of several locations in the Czech Republic:

 Libkov, a village in Pardubice Region (Chrudim District)
 Libkov, a village in Plzeň Region (Domažlice District)